(lit. Arthur and Astaroth's Mysterious Demon World Village) is a 1996 puzzle video game for the Sega Saturn and PlayStation which was only released in Japan. Capcom licensed Dynamix's Sid & Al's Incredible Toons engine with a Ghosts 'n Goblins motif, so it is essentially a sequel to that game. The game was initially completed without the Ghosts 'n Goblins characters, which Capcom decided to add in at the last minute.

References

External links

1996 video games
Crossover video games
Dark fantasy video games
Ghosts'n Goblins
Japan-exclusive video games
PlayStation (console) games
Puzzle video games
Sega Saturn games
Video games developed in Japan